The 2019–20 UNLV Runnin' Rebels basketball team represented the University of Nevada, Las Vegas during the 2019–20 NCAA Division I men's basketball season. The Runnin' Rebels were led by first-year head coach T. J. Otzelberger and played their home games at the Thomas & Mack Center in Paradise, Nevada as members of the Mountain West Conference. They finished the season 17–15, 12–6 in Mountain West play to finish in a three-way tie for second place. They lost in the quarterfinals of the Mountain West tournament to Boise State.

Previous season
The Runnin' Rebels finished the 2018–19 season 17–14, 11–7 in Mountain West play to finish in a tie for fourth place. They lost in the quarterfinals of the Mountain West tournament to San Diego State.

On March 15, head coach Marvin Menzies was fired. He finished at UNLV with a three-year record of 48–48.

On March 27, UNLV hired South Dakota State head coach T. J. Otzelberger as their next head coach.

Offseason

Departures

Incoming transfers

2019 recruiting class
No recruits.

2020 recruiting class

2021 recruiting class

Roster

Schedule and results

|-
!colspan=9 style=| Exhibition

|-
!colspan=9 style=| Regular season

|-
!colspan=9 style=| Mountain West tournament

Source

References

UNLV
UNLV Runnin' Rebels basketball seasons
Run
Run